Curimopsis is a genus of pill beetles in the family Byrrhidae. There are more than 30 described species in Curimopsis.

Species
These 38 species belong to the genus Curimopsis:

 Curimopsis albonotata (LeConte, 1861)
 Curimopsis andalusiaca (Franz, 1967)
 Curimopsis austriaca (Franz, 1967)
 Curimopsis brancomontis Pütz, 2002
 Curimopsis brevicollis Casey
 Curimopsis canariensis (Franz, 1967)
 Curimopsis capitata (Wollaston, 1854)
 Curimopsis carniolica (Ganglbauer, 1902)
 Curimopsis cyclolepidia (Münster, 1902)
 Curimopsis echinata (LeConte, 1850)
 Curimopsis ehimensis Kitano & Sakai, 2006
 Curimopsis franzi Paulus, 1973
 Curimopsis ganglbaueri (Plavilshikov, 1924)
 Curimopsis granulosa (Wollaston, 1865)
 Curimopsis horrida (Wollaston, 1854)
 Curimopsis incisa (Obenberger, 1917)
 Curimopsis integra (Wollaston, 1864)
 Curimopsis italica (Franz, 1967)
 Curimopsis jordai (Reitter, 1910)
 Curimopsis madeirensis Pütz, 2002
 Curimopsis maderiensis Puetz, 2002
 Curimopsis monticola (Franz, 1967)
 Curimopsis moosilauke Johnson, 1986
 Curimopsis nigrita (Palm, 1934)
 Curimopsis ovuliformis (Wollaston, 1854)
 Curimopsis paleata (Erichson, 1846)
 Curimopsis palmi (Franz, 1967)
 Curimopsis provencalis (Franz, 1967)
 Curimopsis senicis Pütz, 2002
 Curimopsis setigera (Illiger, 1798)
 Curimopsis setulosa (Mannerheim, 1852)
 Curimopsis strigosa (Melsheimer, 1844)
 Curimopsis syriaca (Baudi, 1870)
 Curimopsis tenerifensis (Palm, 1976)
 Curimopsis tsurugisana Kitano, Pütz & Sakai, 2008
 Curimopsis vicentina Paulus, 1973
 Curimopsis wollastoni Pütz, 2002
 † Syncalypta albonotata (Le Conte, 1850)

References

Further reading

External links

 

Byrrhidae
Articles created by Qbugbot